Thompson Creative is an American radio jingle production company formerly based in Dallas, Texas.

History

In 1986, broadcasters Larry and Susan Thompson set up Thompson Creative with the idea of updating the "traditional" jingle sound. Utilizing a wide variety of singers, composers, arrangers and engineers, Thompson Creative has become one of the top producers of musical station identification jingles and promo music for radio stations worldwide. Packages like Crescent City Magic, The Edge, Houston Mix, Cuddle, Holly Days and contributed more than 150 packages and resings.

Thompson have creative and syndicated radio IDs for radio stations all over the world, including WOR, WYYY, WMGQ, WDRC-FM, WRCH, KOSI KBAY and KEZY in America, as well as Atlantic 252, Clyde 1 and Amber Radio in the UK.

In 1991 Ben Freedman was recruited from TM Century to become Vice President and Sales Manager at Thompson. In less than 4 years Ben and Larry managed to turn Thompson into one of the top 3 jingle companies in Dallas. However, Ben left in 1995 to form his own jingle company Ben Freedman Productions.

On September 14, 2010 it was announced that Music Oasis, Inc. of Scottsdale, Arizona; parent company of ZONE Radio Imaging, purchased Thompson Creative. Bruce Upchurch, its founder and president, has been in the business of creating radio imaging and advertising music under the ZONE moniker for two decades and previously worked for JAM Creative Productions and TM Studios amongst others. The collected reference tape archives of Thompson Creative reside with Media Preservation Foundation in Springfield, Massachusetts. Owner Larry Thompson currently does voice over work along with his wife.

Studios

Thompson's studio facilities were originally located at 4631 Insurance Lane in Dallas, Texas: prior home to The Sundance Organization and JAM Creative Productions. The Thompsons gutted and built new studios at 4141 Office Parkway in Dallas. This famous address has been synonymous with jingle making since the early 1950s and was formerly home to PAMS Productions from 1961–1978. Thousands of iconic radio jingles have been recorded there.

Larry Thompson is also sought-after to voice radio commercials

The UK agent for Thompson is Dave Langer.

References

External links
Thompson Creative website
Media Preservation Foundation

Companies based in Dallas
Jingle companies
Mass media companies of the United States
American radio networks
American music radio programs
Radio production companies